Colognola ai Colli is a comune (municipality) in the Province of Verona in the Italian region Veneto, located about  west of Venice and about  east of Verona.

Colognola ai Colli borders the following municipalities: Belfiore, Caldiero, Cazzano di Tramigna, Illasi, Lavagno, and Soave.

Main sights
Church of Santa Maria della Pieve (12th century). It was originally a temple devoted to the Roman god Mercury.

Main products 
 'Wines: Valpolicella DOC, Amarone DOC and Recioto Soave DOC
 "Bisi" (Peas): this product makes Colognola ai Colli famous all over the province of Verona. Every year in May, there is a festival dedicated to Colognola's peas: "La Sagra dei Bisi". The typical dish is called 'Risi e bisi', risotto with peas.

Sister city 
  Răcăciuni (Romania)

References

External links
 Official website

Cities and towns in Veneto